The Focke-Achgelis Fa 284 was a project to develop a large transport helicopter, designed in 1943 by Focke-Achgelis for use by the Luftwaffe. The helicopter was powered by two BMW 801 radial engines, driving transversely-mounted rotors, and was equipped with a large, detachable cargo pod for carrying loads.

The Fa 284 project was abandoned in late 1943, being replaced by a design for an enlarged version of the Fa 223 featuring a four-rotor arrangement; this project was also abandoned.

Specifications

See also

References
Citations

Bibliography

Fa 284
1940s German military transport aircraft
1940s German helicopters
Twin-engined piston helicopters
Transverse rotor helicopters
Modular aircraft
World War II helicopters of Germany
Abandoned military aircraft projects of Germany